Kasarkod  is a village in the southern state of Karnataka, India. It is located in the Honavar taluk of Uttara Kannada district in Karnataka.

Demographics
 India census, Kasarkod had a population of 7604 with 3801 males and 3803 females. This beach got blue flag certificate along with Padubidri Karnataka which got blue flag.
The official name of the beach is "Dhareshwar Beach " as  mentioned in the official website of Uttar Kannada. District

See also
 Uttara Kannada
 Mangalore
 Districts of Karnataka

References

External links
 

Villages in Uttara Kannada district